The Coast is a free alternative weekly newspaper in Halifax, Nova Scotia, Canada. The paper distributes 24,000 copies per week throughout the Halifax Regional Municipality. The paper is owned by Overstory Media Group.

Founded in 1993, The Coast has a generally left wing editorial policy. It focuses on local issues, especially "people working for change" within the community.

The Coast is available in Bedford, Lower Sackville, Tantallon, and the Stanfield International Airport, but 75 percent of its readership lives in downtown Halifax and Dartmouth.

The paper claims a readership of 61,263. According to a January 2007 Corporate Research Associates metro quarterly survey, 55 percent of The Coasts readers are between 18 and 34 years of age (34.701 readers).

See also
List of newspapers in Canada

References

External links
 

Alternative weekly newspapers published in Canada
Newspapers published in Halifax, Nova Scotia
Weekly newspapers published in Nova Scotia
Publications established in 1993
1993 establishments in Nova Scotia